Ella Dietz (Dietz; after first marriage, Clymer, after second marriage, Glynes; pen and stage name, Ella Dietz; January 27, 1847 – January 9, 1920) was an American actress and author. Professionally known by her maiden name, Ella Dietz, she was a writer of poems and songs, an instructor in elocution and dramatic art, a reader, and a reciter for charitable events. In the United States, she served as the fifth president of Sorosis, vice-president of the National Council of Women, and was a leading member of the Advisory Board of The Federation of Clubs. To the British public, she was well-known for her histrionic abilities, having acted leading roles in over thirty plays in London during the period of 1874 to 1881. She was also skilled as an artist with pencil and brush.

Early life and education
Ella Maria Dietz was born in New York City, January 27, 1847 (or 1856). She was the daughter of William Henry and Frances Virginia (Robinson) Dietz, granddaughter of John and Sophia (Meinell) Dietz, and great-granddaughter of John Dietz. who emigrated from Strasbourg, Alsace, to New York prior to 1776. She was educated at the Cottage Hill Seminary, Poughkeepsie, New York. On the death of her father, she returned to New York City to assist her mother in her school, the first kindergarten ever established in New York. She wanted to be an actress, but as her mother opposed, she studied drawing and painting instead, along with voice.

Career

Actress
On June 24, 1864, at the age of seventeen, she married Edward Myers Clymer (1822–1883), of Pennsylvania, brother of Hiester Clymer, who was a member of Congress for several years. Her early marriage changed the course of her life, and she attempted to obtain a divorce. Domestic duties, mingled with travel at home and abroad, occupied the next few years. Her winters were passed in studying with the best masters of drawing, elocution and music. After the birth of her only child, changing circumstances made her face the necessity of choosing a profession and she resolved to overcome opposition and became a dramatic artist.

Clymer made her professional debut in New York, in 1871 or 1872, as Pauline in The Lady of Lyons. In the spring of 1874, accompanied by her brother and her sister, the actress, Linda Dietz, Clymer went to France to study at the Conservatoire de Paris and to act at the Haymarket, London, and in surrounding areas. Clymer translated and adapted plays, some of which were produced by a company of her own organizing. In 1880, she helped form "The Church and Stage Guild". Her performances as an actress and dramatic reader of the principal Shakespearean parts were highly commended. It was said that her Juliet was "a revelation, poetical and imaginative in the highest degree." She appeared as Ophelia, Portia, Desdemona, and as Helena in a special revival of Midsummer Night's Dream. In 1881, she brought out a version of Faust, adapted by herself for the English stage, in which she played Margaret.

With a London company, Dietz toured in Romeo and Juliet, As you like it, Lady Clancarty, and a new version of Faust and Marguerite, which she adapted for the English stage. The Court Circular of February 12, 1881, wrote that:

The Northern Evening Mail went on to say:

In 1881, Dietz fatigued of stage life and abandoned the profession. She continued her public readings, however, of which Moncure D. Conway wrote:

Writer
Her literary work began in 1873, when she contributed verses to New York periodicals, and later in London under the pen name of "Ella Dietz". She wrote frequently for the English and American press. In 1877, she published The Triumph of Love (176 pages, Emory Adams Allen, London, 1877), which was well received by the English press. Seven years later, she published The Triumph of Time (London, 1884), which was soon followed by The Triumph of Life (London, Emory Adams Allen, 1885). These were mystical poems, composed of songs, lyrics and sonnets, ranging over the whole gamut of human and divine love, and marked by the same high qualities that distinguished all her work. She wrote several pieces for the "Church and Stage Guild" including "Of Art Critics And Audiences" (to Canon Liddon), "Goethe's Faust" (Church Reformer, December 1885), "Faust's Monologue" (Church Reformer, February 1886), and "Church And Stage, A Paper read by Ella Dietz before the Church Guilds Union" (Church Reformer, March 1886).

While in London she was a member of the Church and Stage Guild, and of the religious Guild of St Matthew. She lectured before clubs and took part in other philanthropic endeavors. She was connected with Sorosis since its beginning, in 1868, and on her return to New York, in 1881, immediately joined its committees, and served for two years as its president. She was a leading factor in the Federation of Women's Clubs.

Personal life
In 1898, she married Webster Glynes. She had one son, Edward Manuel Clymer. 

Ella Dietz Clymer died in London, England, January 9, 1920.

Critical reviews
The Triumph of Love, sold for Three Shillings and Sixpence. It was reviewed by The Examiner who stated—

The Triumph of Time sold for Four Shillings and Sixpence. It was reviewed by The Academy who stated:—

The Literary World commented as well:—

The Triumph of Life sold for Seven Shillings and Sixpence.  It was reviewed by The Graphic who stated:—

Selected works
  1877, The triumph of love. : a mystical poem in songs, sonnets, and verse
  1884, The triumph of time. : Mystical poem
  1885, The triumph of life. : Mystical poem

References

Attribution

Bibliography

External links
 
 

1847 births
1920 deaths
19th-century American actresses
19th-century American poets
19th-century American women writers
American stage actresses
Actresses from New York City
American Christian socialists
American women poets
Anglican socialists
Poets from New York (state)
Female Christian socialists
Wikipedia articles incorporating text from A Woman of the Century